School Without Walls may refer to:

 School Without Walls (Washington, D.C.)
 School Without Walls (Rochester)
 School Without Walls (Live Oak, Florida)
 School Without Walls (Canberra), Australia